Mario Doyon (born August 27, 1968) is a Canadian retired ice hockey defenceman. He played 28 games in the National Hockey League with the Chicago Blackhawks and Quebec Nordiques between 1989 and 1991. The rest of his career, which lasted from 1988 to 2005, was spent in the minor leagues and in several European leagues.

Early life
Doyon was born in Quebec City, Quebec. As a youth, he played in the 1980 and 1981 Quebec International Pee-Wee Hockey Tournaments with a minor ice hockey team from Charlesbourg, Quebec City. He later played in the National Hockey League for the Chicago Blackhawks and Quebec Nordiques.

Achievements and awards 

 1998 Promotion to the Nationalliga A with SC Langnau
 1999 Spengler-Cup-winning with the Cologne Sharks
 2003 German champion with the Krefeld Penguins

Career statistics

Regular season and playoffs

References

External links
 

1968 births
Living people
Bolzano HC players
Canadian ice hockey defencemen
Chicago Blackhawks draft picks
Chicago Blackhawks players
Corpus Christi Rayz players
Drummondville Voltigeurs players
Fredericton Canadiens players
French Quebecers
Halifax Citadels players
Ice hockey people from Quebec City
Indianapolis Ice players
Indianapolis Ice (CHL) players
Kansas City Blades players
Kölner Haie players
Krefeld Pinguine players
Montreal Roadrunners players
New Haven Nighthawks players
Quebec Nordiques players
Saginaw Hawks players
San Francisco Spiders players
SCL Tigers players